The year 1933 in television involved some significant events.
Below is a list of television-related events during 1933.


Events
January 23 – W9XAL in Kansas City begins broadcasting.
January 24 – John Cameron Swayze begins his daily Journal-Post News Flashes on W9XAL, which is simulcast by KMBC radio.
April 21 – The first television revue, named Looking In, is shown on the BBC. The first four minutes of this programme survive on a Silvatone record, an early method of home video recording.
August 4 – W9XAT in Minneapolis, Minnesota makes its first transmission.
RCA performs private field tests in Camden, New Jersey of an electronic television system.

Ending this year
The Television Ghost (1931–1933)

Television shows

Births
January 8 – Charles Osgood, journalist
January 17 – Shari Lewis, puppeteer (died 1998)
February 2 – Tony Jay, actor (died 2006)
February 6 – Leslie Crowther, actor and host, Crackerjack (died 1996)
March 12 – Barbara Feldon, actress, Get Smart
March 13 – Gloria McMillan, actress, Our Miss Brooks
March 19 
Phyllis Newman, actress, game show panelist
Renée Taylor, actress, The Nanny
April 5 – Frank Gorshin, comedian, actor, Batman (died 2005)
April 7 – Wayne Rogers, actor, financial commentator, M*A*S*H (died 2015)
April 26 – Carol Burnett, actress, comedian, The Carol Burnett Show
May 3 – Alex Cord, actor, Airwolf
May 7 – Roger Perry, actor, Arrest and Trial, Harrigan and Son (died 2018)
May 20 – Constance Towers, actress, General Hospital
May 21 – Richard Libertini, actor (died 2016)
June 8 – Joan Rivers, comedian and host, The Joan Rivers Show, Fashion Police (died 2014)
June 20 – Danny Aiello, actor (died 2019)
June 21 – Bernie Kopell, actor, Get Smart, The Love Boat
June 22 – Jacques Martin, presenter and producer (died 2007)
June 27 – Gary Crosby, singer and actor (died 1995)
July 23 – Bert Convy, actor and game show host (died 1991)
July 26 – Kathryn Hays, actress, As the World Turns
July 29 – Robert Fuller, actor, Laramie
July 30 – Edd Byrnes, actor, 77 Sunset Strip
August 1 – Dom DeLuise, actor and comedian (died 2009)
August 11 – Jerry Falwell, televangelist (died 2007)
August 16
Gary Clarke, actor, The Virginian
Julie Newmar, actress, Batman
August 25 – Tom Skerritt, actor, Picket Fences
September 13 – Eileen Fulton, actress, As the World Turns
September 15 – Henry Darrow, Puerto Rican-American actor, The High Chaparral
September 17 – Pat Crowley, actress, A Date With Judy, Please Don't Eat the Daisies
September 18 – Robert Blake, actor, Baretta (died 2023)
September 19 – David McCallum, Scottish-born actor, The Man from U.N.C.L.E., NCIS
September 27 
Greg Morris, actor, Mission: Impossible, Vega$ (died 1996)
Kathleen Nolan, actress, The Real McCoys
November 3 – Ken Berry, actor, F Troop, Mama's Family (died 2018)
November 5 – Herb Edelman, actor, The Good Guys, The Golden Girls (died 1996)
November 19 – Larry King, talk show host (died 2021)
November 26 – Robert Goulet, singer
November 28 – Hope Lange, actress, The Ghost & Mrs. Muir  (died 2003)
December 3 – Les Crane, host (died 2003)
December 8 – Flip Wilson, comedian and host, The Flip Wilson Show (died 1998)
December 15 – Tim Conway, actor, The Carol Burnett Show, McHale's Navy (died 2019)
December 22 – Elizabeth Hubbard, actress, The Doctors, As the World Turns
December 26 – Caroll Spinney, puppeteer, Sesame Street (died 2019)

References